Allen Lein (April 15, 1913, New York City – March 26, 2003, Austin, Texas) was an endocrinologist and medical school professor. He was a Guggenheim Fellow for the academic year 1958–1959.

Lein was a student at the University of Chicago and then transferred to the University of California, Los Angeles (UCLA), where he graduated with bachelor's degree and Ph.D. in zoology, with a focus on endocrinology. During WW II, he served from 1943 to 1946 as an aviation physiologist in the U.S. Army and left with the rank of captain. After teaching at the Ohio State University and Vanderbilt medical schools, he became in 1947 an assistant professor in the physiology department of Northwestern University Medical School. There he eventually became a full professor, director of student affairs, and assistant dean of graduate studies. For the academic year 1954–1955 he was on sabbatical at Caltech, where he worked with Linus Pauling and together they wrote a paper entitled The Combining Power of Myoglobin for Alkyl Isocyanides and the Structure of the Myoglobin Molecule. For the academic year 1958–1959 Lein was a Guggenheim Fellow at the Laboratoire de Biochimie, Collège de France.

In 1968 Lein became a professor of reproductive medicine at La Jolla's University of California San Diego School of Medicine, where he retired as professor emeritus in 1980.

His 135-page book The Cycling Female: Her Menstrual Rhythm was published in 1979 by W. H. Freeman and Company.

Lein stayed in La Jolla and remained active in teaching and research for many years after his formal retirement. Shortly before he died of a heart attack in 2003, he and his wife moved to Texas to be near their daughter.

His doctoral students include Neena Schwartz.

Upon his death he was survived by his widow, a daughter, a son, and three grandchildren.

Selected publications

References

1913 births
2003 deaths
American endocrinologists
American medical academics
University of California, Los Angeles alumni
Northwestern University faculty
University of California, San Diego faculty
University of Chicago alumni